St. Thomas School is an independent school in Medina, an Eastside suburb of Seattle, Washington, United States.

Description
St. Thomas School provides early childhood, pre-primary, and primary education for students from 2 ½ years of age through to the eighth grade. It has a close relationship with, but is independent from, the adjacent St. Thomas Episcopal Church and is a member of the National Association of Episcopal Schools,
the National Association of Independent Schools
the Northwest Accreditation Commission,
the Pacific Northwest Association of Independent Schools
and the Washington Federation of Independent Schools.

The average class size for Early Childhood is 12-15 students and for Primary is 15-18 students.

Programs
 Athletics
 Chapel and Character
 Clubs
 Early Learning Center
 Elementary Center
 Extended Day
 Falcon's Ledge
 Fine Arts
 Foreign Language
 Library and Media Center
 Middle School
 Service Learning
 Technology

History

St. Thomas School began in 1951 as St. Thomas Day School, a parish school of St. Thomas (Episcopal) Church, and was located across the street from the church.   In 1954, the first permanent school buildings were constructed on the current site.  In 1968, the school became fully independent of the church.  Various expansions occurred until 2008 when the school buildings were demolished and replaced with a new facility designed by Bassetti Architects.

Facilities

The school shares a campus with St. Thomas Episcopal Church.  The two facilities are adjacent but not connected.  The school's playground is shielded from outside view by the L-shaped configuration of the two-story school building.  The public facades of the school are designed to reflect the more formal, rectangular, stone-clad character of the adjacent church.  The facades that face the playground are more informal, free-form, and brightly colored.

Three of the school's four wings (two each on two floors) are for a different age group, with classrooms opening off of common activity areas for group learning, tutoring, project-based learning, and individual instruction. The fourth wing houses the library and specialist classrooms (music, art, Spanish, etc.). The building includes a science lab, technology center, media publishing lab, library/multi-media center, a dedicated foreign language classroom, music room, and exterior covered plazas for play and outdoor learning.

The facility was designed to celebrate cycles of nature and human learning, to demonstrate leadership in environmental responsibility, and to support the school's educational program by addressing the latest research on cognitive development.  The grounds include a playfield, covered play areas, and a children's garden for students to cultivate plants.

St. Thomas is in the process of expanding its facilities. In the Spring of 2021, a new gym and theater complex opened on newly acquired property next to the current campus.  St. Thomas' Center for Leadership and Innovation is completing new offices and work space on campus that should be finished in 2022.

Sustainable Features

The school facilities are notable for their sustainable features.

LEED Gold:  The new building was Washington State's first to receive Gold certification by the US Green Building Council's Leadership in Energy and Environmental Design program under the LEED for Schools Rating System.

Energy Star:  The facility received an Energy Star design rating that indicates 30 percent less energy usage than a typical school of this size. Carbon dioxide emissions are reduced by approximately 130 tons per year.

Due to the successful efforts of students to introduce food recycling and reduce food waste (with use of composting), STS has been certified as a Washington Area Green School.

References

External links 

 School website
 St. Thomas Church website
 National Association of Independent Schools
 Northwest Accreditation Commission
 Pacific Northwest Association of Independent Schools
 Daily Journal of Commerce article August 20, 2009
 Greatschools.org
 Private School Review
 St. Thomas Episcopal Church
 US Green Building Council
 LEED for Schools
 Energy Star profile
 Washington Area Green Schools
 Washington Federation of Independent Schools

Private elementary schools in Washington (state)
Private middle schools in Washington (state)
Leadership in Energy and Environmental Design gold certified buildings